Born in 1967, Brooks was the youngest of four children.

Since the mid–1990s, Brooks has guest-starred in such television shows as NYPD Blue, The Young and the Restless, The Sopranos, The Larry Sanders Show, Strong Medicine,  Martin, Family Matters, The Fresh Prince of Bel-Air, Arli$$, The King of Queens,The Wayans Bros., The Jamie Foxx Show, as well as providing the voice of Indira "Indy" Daimonji in the MTV series Spider-Man: The New Animated Series. She also appeared in the films The Brothers (2001), Blue Hill Avenue (2001), Book of Love (2002), and her feature-film debut Cappuccino (1998).

In 1995, Brooks was one of ten women who appeared in the first mass-market black female swimsuit calendar in the United States, The Darker Image.

Filmography

Film

Television

References

External links

1967 births
20th-century American actresses
21st-century American actresses
Actresses from Miami
Actresses from Los Angeles
African-American actresses
American film actresses
American television actresses
American voice actresses
Living people
People from View Park–Windsor Hills, California
20th-century African-American women
20th-century African-American people
21st-century African-American women
21st-century African-American people